Kenniscentrum Psychologie (The Center for Psychology, KCP) is a Dutch community of psychologists and related professionals. Its members form a "virtual action learning group" for expertise. Furthermore, for anyone who deals with psychology, it is a major medium for monitoring the latest developments, including the publication of news, scientific articles and columns. KCP also serves as a job market through its job and resume bank.

External links 

Organisations based in the Netherlands